E. Doğan Acarbay (5 February 1927 – 13 June 2004) was a Turkish sprinter. He competed in the 400 metres at the 1948 Summer Olympics and the 1952 Summer Olympics.

References

External links
 

1927 births
2004 deaths
Athletes (track and field) at the 1948 Summer Olympics
Athletes (track and field) at the 1952 Summer Olympics
Turkish male sprinters
Turkish male hurdlers
Olympic athletes of Turkey
Mediterranean Games silver medalists for Turkey
Mediterranean Games medalists in athletics
Athletes (track and field) at the 1951 Mediterranean Games
20th-century Turkish people